Černíkovice may refer to places in the Czech Republic:

Černíkovice (Plzeň-North District), a municipality and village in the Plzeň Region
Černíkovice (Rychnov nad Kněžnou District), a municipality and village in the Hradec Králové Region
Černíkovice, a village and part of Chrášťany (Benešov District) in the Central Bohemian Region